Joseph Vincent "Joey" Victory Gay (born ) is an American actor and comedian who competed in Last Comic Standing 4. He has had numerous appearances in Law & Order, and appeared on Live at Gotham.

Gay purchased Pips Comedy Club, regarded as one of the oldest comedy clubs in the United States, in 2004.

References

External links
 Last Comic Standing Profile (Broken)
 

American male comedians
21st-century American comedians
American male television actors
Last Comic Standing contestants
Living people
Year of birth uncertain
Place of birth missing (living people)
Year of birth missing (living people)